Avram or Abraham is the founding patriarch of the Israelites, Ishmaelites, Midianites and Edomite peoples.

Avram may also refer to:
 Avram (given name), a masculine given name
 Avram (surname), a surname
 Grand Duchy of Avram, a micronation in Australia

See also
Abram (disambiguation)
Abraham (disambiguation)
Avraham (disambiguation)